IBEC may refer to:

 Ibec, an Irish business representation organisation.
 Institute for Bioengineering of Catalonia, a Barcelona  institution engaged in basic and applied research in bioengineering and nanomedicine.